Billy Ray Cyrus is an American country music singer who has released twelve studio albums and forty-four singles since his debut in 1992 with Some Gave All. Cyrus won many awards as an artist, as an actor and as a humanitarian and was inducted into the VFW Hall of Fame for "his outstanding career as a country singer and in sincere appreciation for his support of America's veterans". Furthermore, he was inducted into the Walkway of Stars of the Country Music Hall of Fame.

This is a partial list of awards and nominations, with forty-one wins and seventy-two nominations. In his wins, he has received major awards like the American Music Awards, Billboard Music Awards and Country Music Association Awards.

Country Music Association Awards

|-
| rowspan="2"| 1992
| rowspan="2"| "Achy Breaky Heart"
| Single of the Year
| 
|-
| Music Video of the Year
| 
|-
| 2019
| "Old Town Road"(with Lil Nas X)
| Musical Event of the Year
| 
|}

Billboard Music Awards

|-
| rowspan="1"| 1992
| Some Gave All
| Billboard 200 Albums - Most Weeks at No. 1
| 
|-
|}

Billboard Music Video Conference & Awards

|-
| rowspan="2"| 1992
| rowspan="2"| "Achy Breaky Heart"
| Best Male Artist, Country
| 
|-
| Best New Artist, Country
| 
|-
|}

AMOA Jukebox Awards

|-
| rowspan="3"| 1992
| rowspan="2"| "Achy Breaky Heart"
| Pop Record of the Year
| 
|-
| Country Record of the Year
| 
|-
| Himself
| Rising Star Award
| 
|-
|}

National Association of Recording Merchandisers

|-
| rowspan="4"| 1992
| rowspan="4"| Himself
| Record of the Year, New Artist
| 
|-
| Record of the Year, Country Male
| 
|-
| Record of the Year, Male
| 
|-
| Record of the Year, Overall
| 
|-
|}

Country Music Television

|-
| 1992
| "Achy Breaky Heart"
| Most Popular Music Video
| 
|-
| 1998
| Himself
| Showcase Artist of February
| 
|-
|}

R&R Readers Pool

|-
| 1992
| Himself
| Best New Artist
| 
|-
|}

People Magazine Awards

|-
| 1992
| Himself
| Most Intriguing People of the Year
| 
|-
|}

Country Music Hall of Fame

|-
| 1992
| Himself
| Walkway of Stars
| 
|-
|}

Juno Awards

|-
| rowspan="2"| 1993
| Some Gave All
| Best Selling Album (Foreign or Domestic)
| 
|-
| "Achy Breaky Heart"
| Best Selling Single (Foreign or Domestic)
| 
|-
|}

American Music Awards

|-
| rowspan="4"| 1993
| Himself
| Favorite Country Male Artist
| 
|-
| Some Gave All
| Favorite Country Album
| 
|-
| "Achy Breaky Heart"
| Favorite Country Single
| 
|-
| Himself
| Favorite Country New Artist
| 
|-
| 1994
| "Romeo" (Dolly Parton & Friends)
| Favorite Country Single
| 
|-
| 2009
| Hannah Montana: The Movie soundtrack
| Favorite Soundtrack Album
| 
|-
| rowspan="4"| 2019
| rowspan="4"| "Old Town Road"
| Collaboration of the Year
| 
|-
| Favorite Music Video
| 
|-
| Favorite Song - Pop/Rock
| 
|-
| Favorite Song - Rap/Hip Hop
| 
|}

Academy of Country Music Awards

|-
| rowspan="4"| 1993
| Some Gave All
| Album of the Year
| 
|-
| Himself
| Entertainer of the Year
| 
|-
| "Achy Breaky Heart"
| Single Record of the Year
| 
|-
| Himself
| Top New Male Vocalist
| 
|-
| rowspan="2"| 1994
| It Won't Be the Last
| Album of the Year
| 
|-
| Himself
| Top Male Vocalist
| 
|-
|}

World Music Awards

|-
| 1993
| Himself
| Best International New Artist of the Year
| 
|-
|}

Canadian Country Music Association Awards

|-
| 1993
| Some Gave All
| Top Selling Album (Foreign or Domestic)
| 
|-
|}

Grammy Awards

|-
| rowspan="3"| 1993
| rowspan="2"| "Achy Breaky Heart"
| Record of the Year
| 
|-
| Best Country Vocal Performance, Male
| 
|-
| Himself
| Best New Artist
| 
|-
| 1994
| "Romeo" (Dolly Parton & Friends)
| Best Country Vocal Collaboration
| 
|-
| rowspan="3"| 2020
| rowspan="3"| "Old Town Road"
| Record of the Year
| 
|-
| Best Pop Duo/Group Performance
| 
|-
| Best Music Video
| 
|-
|}

Childhelp USA

|-
| 1994
| Himself
| Humanitarian Award
| 
|-
|}

University of California, Berkeley

|-
| 1995
| Himself
| Popular Cultural Society's Innovator Award
| 
|-
|}

State of South Carolina

|-
| 1995
| Himself
| Humanitarian Award
| 
|-
|}

Congressional Medal of Honor Society

|-
| 1995
| Himself
| Bob Hope Award for Excellence in Entertainment
| 
|-
|}

Country Music Cares

|-
| 1995
| Himself
| Humanitarian Award
| 
|-
|}

Country Radio Broadcasters

|-
| 1996
| Himself
| Humanitarian Award
| 
|-
|}

VFW Hall of Fame

|-
| 1996
| Himself
| Hall of Fame
| 
|-
|}

TNN/Music City News Country Awards

|-
| rowspan="3"| 1993
| Himself
| Star of Tomorrow
| 
|-
| rowspan="2"| Achy Breaky Heart
| Single of the Year
| 
|-
| Video of the Year
| 
|-
| rowspan="2"| 1994
| rowspan="2"| Himself
| Male Artist of the Year
| 
|-
| Star of Tomorrow
| 
|-
| rowspan="5"| 1997
| rowspan="2"| Himself
| Entertainer of the Year
| 
|-
| Male Artist of the Year
| 
|-
| Trail of Tears
| Album of the Year
| 
|-
| rowspan="2"| "Trail of Tears"
| Single of the Year
| 
|-
| Video of the Year
| 
|-
| rowspan="6"| 1998
| rowspan="2"| Himself
| Entertainer of the Year
| 
|-
| Male Artist of the Year
| 
|-
| The Best of Billy Ray Cyrus: Cover to Cover
| Album of the Year
| 
|-
| rowspan="2"| "It's All the Same to Me"
| Single of the Year
| 
|-
| Song of the Year
| 
|-
| "Three Little Words"
| Video of the Year
| 
|-
|}

Modern Screen's Country Music Magazine

|-
| 1997
| rowspan="3"| Himself
| rowspan="3"| Entertainer and Male Artist
| 
|-
| 1998
| 
|-
| 1999
| 
|-
|}

Air Force Sergeants Awards

|-
| 1997
| Himself
| Americanism Award
| 
|-
|}

International Entertainment Buyers Association

|-
| 1999
| Himself
| Humanitarian of the Year
| 
|-
|}

MusicRow Awards

|-
| 1999
| "Give My Heart to You"
| Video of the Year
| 
|-
|}

Dove Awards

|-
| 2004
| The Other Side
| Country Album of the Year
| 
|-
| 2005
| "I Need You Now"
| Country Song of the Year
| 
|-
|}

MovieGuide Awards

|-
| 2005
| Doc ("Happy Trails" episode)
| Grace Award
| 
|-
| 2010
| Christmas in Canaan (with Matt Ward)
| Grace Award
| 
|-
|}

CMT Music Awards

|-
| 2008
| "Ready, Set, Don't Go"
| Tearjerker Video of the Year
| 
|-
|}

Teen Choice Awards

|-
| rowspan="1"|2009
| Hannah Montana
| Choice TV Parental Unit 
| 
|-
| rowspan="2"| 2019
| rowspan="2"| "Old Town Road (Remix)" (Shared with: Lil Nas X)
| Choice Collaboration
| 
|-
| Choice R&B/Hip-Hop Song
| 
|-
|}

GMC Video Awards

|-
| 2010
| "Somebody Said a Prayer"
| Favorite Country Video
| 
|-
|}

Golden Raspberry Awards

|-
| 2010
| Hannah Montana: The Movie
| Worst Supporting Actor 2009
| 
|-
| 2011
| The Spy Next Door
| Worst Supporting Actor 2010
| 
|-
|}

American Society of Young Musician Awards

|-
| 2010
| Himself
| Best Country Artist
| 
|-
|}

MTV Video Music Awards
The MTV Video Music Award was established in 1984 by MTV to award the music videos of the year. Cyrus has won two awards out of seven nominations.
|-
| rowspan=7| 2019
| Video of the Year
| rowspan=7|"Old Town Road (Remix)"(shared with Lil Nas X)
| 
|-
| Song of the Year
| 
|-
| Best Collaboration
| 
|-
| Best Hip-Hop Video
| 
|-
| Best Direction
| 
|-
| Best Editing
| 
|-
| Best Art Direction
| 
|-
|}

References

Awards
Cyrus, Billy Ray